Miranda is the first studio album by Icelandic punk band Tappi Tíkarrass. It was released on December 23, 1983 through Gramm.

The inner sleeve features the lyrics of "Mýrin Andar" handwritten by Björk and a black-and-white child-like illustration.

Track listing

Personnel
Credits adapted from the album's liner notes.
 Tappi Tíkarrass – production
 Björk Guðmundsdóttir – vocals (tracks 2–12); keyboards
 Eyþór Árnalds – vocals (tracks 1, 13); backing vocals (tracks 7, 12)
 Jakob Smári Magnússon – bass
 Eyjólfur Jóhannsson – guitar
 Oddur F. Sigurbjarnason – drums
 Tony Cook – production, engineering

References

1983 albums
Tappi Tíkarrass albums
Albums produced by Björk